Parth Satwalkar (born 28 June 1974) is an Indian former cricketer. He played twelve first-class matches for Hyderabad between 1999 and 2001.

See also
 List of Hyderabad cricketers

References

External links
 

1974 births
Living people
Indian cricketers
Hyderabad cricketers
Cricketers from Hyderabad, India